Welty is an unincorporated community in Okfuskee County, Oklahoma, United States. Named for the town developer, Edwin A. Welty, its post office was established October 12, 1905, with Jerimiah D. Wilson as the first postmaster.

Welty is south of Bristow and north of Castle on the west side of Oklahoma State Highway 48 off E 960 Rd.

Okemah Lake, southeast of town,  features swimming, boating, hunting, fishing, and camping.

Demographics

References

Unincorporated communities in Okfuskee County, Oklahoma
Unincorporated communities in Oklahoma